The Shellback Island, an oceanic island, is approximately  northwest of Darby Bay, off Wilsons Promontory in Victoria, Australia.

The island, to the mean low-water mark, is part of the Wilsons Promontory National Park and is proclaimed as a Remote and Natural Area under the National Parks Act.  The surrounding waters to a distance of 300 m from the mean low-water mark are part of Wilsons Promontory Marine Park.  The island is part of the Wilsons Promontory Islands Important Bird Area, identified as such by BirdLife International because of its importance for breeding seabirds.

References

Islands of Victoria (Australia)
Wilsons Promontory
Important Bird Areas of Victoria (Australia)